Robert Lutyens (13 June 1901 – 1972) was an English interior designer, the son of the architect Sir Edwin Lutyens. He designed the interiors of the homes of several of the directors of Marks & Spencer and subsequently joined the board of that company in 1934. He worked with J.M. Monro & Son to create a modular design scheme for the façades of over 40 Marks & Spencer stores. He also painted.

Selected publications
 Sir Edwin Lutyens an appreciation in perspective by his son. 1942
 An understanding of architecture. People's Universities Press, London, 1948. (With Harold Greenwood)
 Six great architects. 1959

References

External links

1901 births
1971 deaths
English interior designers
20th-century English non-fiction writers
Marks & Spencer people
Lutyens family
20th-century English male writers
English male non-fiction writers